Robyn Anne Owens  is an Australian applied mathematician and computer scientist known for her research in computer vision and face recognition, and on the non-invasive imaging of lactation. Formerly a professor at the University of Western Australia (UWA) and the deputy vice-chancellor for research at UWA, she retired in 2019, and remains affiliated with UWA as a professorial fellow.

Education and career
Owens earned a bachelor's degree in mathematics (with honours) at the University of Western Australia and a doctorate in mathematics at the University of Oxford. Her 1980 dissertation, Almost Periodic Hardy Spaces, was supervised by David Albert Edwards. She returned to the University of Western Australia after postdoctoral study at Paris-Sud University. Before becoming vice-chancellor for research, she headed the UWA School of Computer Science & Software Engineering.

Recognition
Owens is a Fellow of the Australian Computer Society, a Fellow of the Australian Academy of Technology and Engineering (elected 2012), and a Fellow of the Australian Academy of Science (elected 2020).

With her co-author Peter E. Hartmann, she was a winner of the 2010 Rank Prize in Nutrition, given at the Royal College of Physicians in London, for their work on the imaging of lactation.

References

External links

Audio interview with Owens, Women in Research

Year of birth missing (living people)
Living people
Australian computer scientists
Australian women computer scientists
Australian mathematicians
Australian women mathematicians
University of Western Australia alumni
Academic staff of the University of Western Australia
Fellows of the Australian Academy of Science
Fellows of the Australian Academy of Technological Sciences and Engineering